Reuben Craythorne (21 January 1882–1953) was an English footballer who played in the Football League for Notts County.

References

1882 births
1953 deaths
English footballers
Association football midfielders
English Football League players
Kidderminster Harriers F.C. players
Coventry City F.C. players
Walsall F.C. players
Notts County F.C. players
Darlington F.C. players